Huo Shilian (April 1909 – November 17, 1996) was a People's Republic of China politician. He was born in Shanxi Province. He was Minister of Agriculture from February 1979 to March 1981. He was Chinese Communist Party (CCP) Committee Secretary of Shanxi (1980–1983) and Shaanxi (1965–1967). He was governor of Zhejiang. He was CCP Committee Secretary and Chairmen of Ningxia (1977–1979). He was a member of the 11th Central Committee of the Chinese Communist Party, 12th Central Committee of the Chinese Communist Party and the Central Advisory Commission. He was a delegate to the 1st National People's Congress, 2nd National People's Congress, 3rd National People's Congress, 4th National People's Congress and 5th National People's Congress. He was President of Zhejiang University (1953-1958).  He left the public eye in 1987.  He died in Beijing at the age of 87.

References

1909 births
1996 deaths
People's Republic of China politicians from Shanxi
Chinese Communist Party politicians from Shanxi
Political office-holders in Shanxi
Political office-holders in Shaanxi
Political office-holders in Ningxia
Governors of Zhejiang
Members of the 12th Central Committee of the Chinese Communist Party
Members of the 11th Central Committee of the Chinese Communist Party
Members of the Central Advisory Commission
Delegates to the 5th National People's Congress
Delegates to the 4th National People's Congress
Delegates to the 3rd National People's Congress
Delegates to the 2nd National People's Congress
Delegates to the 1st National People's Congress
Presidents of Zhejiang University
Ministers of Agriculture of the People's Republic of China
Political commissars of the Shanxi Military District
Politicians from Xinzhou